The 1946 Giro d'Italia was the 29th edition of the Giro d'Italia, one of cycling's Grand Tours. The field consisted of 79 riders, and 40 riders finished the race.

By rider

By nationality

References

1946 Giro d'Italia
1946